Diego Barbosa Tavares (born 6 July 1991 in Capitão Leônidas Marques), or simply Diego Tavares, is a Brazilian footballer. He currently plays for Remo.

Honours

Fortaleza
Campeonato Brasileiro Série B: 2018

Sampaio Corrêa
Campeonato Maranhense: 2020

Figueirense
Copa Santa Catarina: 2021

References

External links
 Diego Tavares at playmakerstats.com (English version of ogol.com.br)
 

1991 births
Living people
Brazilian footballers
Paraná Clube players
Avaí FC players
Botafogo Futebol Clube (SP) players
Fortaleza Esporte Clube players
Esporte Clube São Bento players
Sampaio Corrêa Futebol Clube players
Figueirense FC players
Vila Nova Futebol Clube players
Clube do Remo players
Association football forwards